An oil well dog house is the steel-sided room adjacent to an oil rig floor, usually having an access door close to the driller's controls. This general-purpose shelter is a combination tool shed, office, communications center, coffee room, lunchroom, and general meeting place for the driller and his crew. It is at the same elevation as the rig floor, usually cantilevered out from the main substructure supporting the rig.

References

External links
 Schlumberger Oilfield Glossary
 The History of the Oil Industry
 "Black Gold" Popular Mechanics, January 1930 - large photo article on oil drilling in the 1920s and 1930s
 "World's Deepest Well" Popular Science, August 1938, article on the late 1930s technology of drilling oil wells
 'Ancient Chinese Drilling' article from June 2004 CSEG Recorder

Oilfield terminology